Alma Söderhjelm (10 May 1870 – 16 March 1949) was a Swedish-speaking Finnish historian and the first female professor in Finland.

Academic career 

After gaining an M.A. in history, Söderhjelm spent three years in Paris, preparing her doctoral thesis under the supervision of Alphonse Aulard. This was a study of journalism during the French Revolution and it was published as Le Régime de la presse pendant la Révolution française. 
She was awarded a doctorate in 1900.

On the basis of this thesis, the university unanimously proposed to award her a lectureship. This appointment was delayed until 1906, because of political concern over her father and her brother. The Emperor was also concerned that if a woman became a lecturer in Finland, the same demand would be made in Russia.

In 1906, she finally became the first female lecturer in Finland. She stayed in this position until 1927. At this point, she became chair of General History at Åbo Akademi University, and thus the first female professor in Finland.

Her academic work also involved editing the correspondence of the French Queen Marie Antoinette with the Swedish nobleman von Fersen and with some French revolutionaries.

Other activities 

Söderhjelm worked as a journalist, writing a column for the newspaper Åbo Underrättelser. She also wrote novels, poetry, and a five-volume memoir.
She co-wrote the screenplay for The Blizzard (1923), directed by Mauritz Stiller.

Söderhjelm was politically active. She smuggled journals into Finland from Sweden, and helped military volunteers to move from Sweden into Germany.

References

External links
 
 Alma Söderhjelm in 375 humanists – 27 April 2015. Faculty of Arts, University of Helsinki.

Further reading  
  
  

1870 births
1949 deaths
Historians of the French Revolution
Finnish women historians
Finnish women academics
Swedish-speaking Finns
Academic staff of Åbo Akademi University
20th-century Finnish historians